Konstantinos Papadakis may refer to:

Konstantinos Papadakis (pianist) (born 1972), Greek pianist
Konstantinos Papadakis (politician) (born 1975), Greek politician
Konstantinos Papadakis (basketball) (born 1998), Greek basketball player or Panathinaikos